Brzeźnio  is a village in Sieradz County, Łódź Voivodeship, in central Poland. It is the seat of the gmina (administrative district) called Gmina Brzeźnio.

The village has a population of 1,150.

References

Villages in Sieradz County